Grønning is a small village in Hadsel Municipality in Nordland county, Norway. The tiny village area is home to Grønning Church, which serves the northern part of Hadsel Municipality.

References

Hadsel
Villages in Nordland